Kosmos 1966 ( meaning Cosmos 1966) is a Soviet US-K missile early warning satellite which was launched in 1988 as part of the Soviet military's Oko programme. The satellite is designed to identify missile launches using optical telescopes and infrared sensors.

Kosmos 1966 was launched from Site 16/2 at Plesetsk Cosmodrome in the Russian SSR. A Molniya-M carrier rocket with a 2BL upper stage was used to perform the launch, which took place at 14:14 UTC on 30 August 1988. The launch successfully placed the satellite into a molniya orbit. It subsequently received its Kosmos designation, and the international designator 1988-076A . The United States Space Command assigned it the Satellite Catalog Number 19445.

It re-entered the Earth's atmosphere on 10 November 2005.

See also

List of Kosmos satellites (1751–2000)
List of R-7 launches (1985–1989)
1988 in spaceflight
List of Oko satellites

References

Kosmos satellites
Spacecraft launched in 1988
Oko
Spacecraft launched by Molniya-M rockets
Spacecraft which reentered in 2005
1988 in the Soviet Union